Leon, Léon (French) or León (Spanish) may refer to:

Places

Europe
 León, Spain, capital city of the Province of León
 Province of León, Spain
 Kingdom of León, an independent state in the Iberian Peninsula from 910 to 1230 and again from 1296 to 1301
 León (historical region), composed of the Spanish provinces León, Salamanca, and Zamora
 Viscounty of Léon, a feudal state in France during the 11th to 13th centuries
 Saint-Pol-de-Léon, a commune in Brittany, France
 Léon, Landes, a commune in Aquitaine, France
 Isla de León, a Spanish island
 Leon (Souda Bay), an islet in Souda Bay, Chania, on the island of Crete

North America
 León, Guanajuato, Mexico, a large city
 Leon, California, United States, a ghost town
 Leon, Iowa, United States
 Leon, Kansas, United States
 Leon, New York, United States
 Leon, Oklahoma, United States
 Leon, Virginia, United States
 Leon, West Virginia, United States
 Leon, Wisconsin (disambiguation), United States, several places
 New Kingdom of León, a territory of Spain (1582-1821) in Mexico, roughly corresponding in area to modern Nuevo León
 Leon County, Florida
 Leon County, Texas
 Leon Township, Clearwater County, Minnesota
 Leon Township, Goodhue County, Minnesota
 Leon River, Texas

Central America
 León Department, Nicaragua
 León, Nicaragua, capital city of the León Department

Other places
 Leon, Iloilo, Philippines, a 2nd class municipality
 Leon, Togo, a village
 Leon River (Colombia)

People

People with the nickname or stage name
 Leon (Japanese wrestler), (born 1980), Japanese professional wrestler
 Leon Robinson (born 1962), African-American actor and singer usually credited as "Leon"
 Leon (German singer) (born 1969), German performer in the 1996 Eurovision Song Contest
 Léon (Swedish singer) (born 1993), Swedish singer
 El León, (born 1975), Puerto Rican professional wrestler
 Frère León (1871–1955), Franco-Cuban botanist, born Joseph Sylvestre Sauget, known by the botanical author abbreviation León
 Leon Russell (1942–2016), American singer and songwriter

People with the name
 Leon (given name), people whose first name is Leon
 Leon (surname)

Arts and entertainment

Fictional characters 
 Leon (Dead or Alive)
 Leon (Squirrel Boy)
 Leon, main character from the game The Legend of Oasis
 Leon, a character on The Andy Griffith Show
 Leon, a character from the game Pokémon Sword and Shield
Leon, from the Supercell game Brawl Stars
Leon, from the game Rune Factory 4
Léon, a young male cyclops created by Annie Groovie
 Leon, a Battle Arena Toshinden character
 Leon Garcia de Asturias, on Trinity Blood
Leon Belmont, a Castlevania character
 Leon Elliott, a Black Cat character
 Leon D. Geeste, a Star Ocean 2 character
 Leon Jefferson III, in Baby Driver
 Leon Karp, a Roseanne character
 Leon S. Kennedy, a Resident Evil character
 Leon Kowalski, a Blade Runner character
Leon Kuwata, from the game Danganronpa: Trigger Happy Havoc
 Squall Leonhart, aka Leon, a Final Fantasy character
 Leon Magnus, a Tales of Destiny character
 Leone "Léon" Montana, the titular protagonist of Léon: The Professional
 Leon Powalski, a Star Fox character
 Leongar, aka Leon, a Kirby character

Works
 Leon (TV series), an animated TV series for children
 Léon: The Professional, a 1994 thriller film directed by Luc Besson
 "Leon", a track on the album Oui Oui Si Si Ja Ja Da Da by Madness

Businesses
 Léon & Lévy, French maker of stereoscopic views and postcards, founded 1864
 Leon Restaurants, fast food chain based in the United Kingdom

Ships
 Greek destroyer Leon (1912)
 Greek destroyer Leon (D54) (1951–1992)
 , a World War II attack transport

Sports clubs
 Club León, Mexican professional football club from León, Guanajuato
 León de Huánuco, Peruvian professional football club from Huánuco, Huánuco Region

Technology
 Leon (software), a vocal for Vocaloid software
 LEON, a microprocessor
 SEAT León, a car from the Spanish manufacturer SEAT

See also
 De León (disambiguation)
 Leon Airport (disambiguation)
 Winter Storm Leon
 Kings of Leon, American rock band
Leonard (disambiguation)
 Leno (disambiguation)